The Miss Tierra República Dominicana 2006 pageant was held on June 28, 2006. This year 42 candidates competed for the national crown. The  winner represented the Dominican Republic at the Miss Earth 2006, which was held in Manila.

Results

Special awards
 Miss Photogenic (voted by press reporters) - Cinthia Tavarez (Elías Piña)
 Miss Congeniality (voted by contestants) - Karina Bisonó (Jimaní)
 Best Face - Susie Matos (Tenares)
 Best Provincial Costume - Reiny Ruiz (Valverde)
 Miss Cultura - Lisa Varoni (La Vega)
 Miss Elegancia - Gina Ferro (Santiago Rodríguez)

Delegates

Miss Dominican Republic
2006 beauty pageants
2006 in the Dominican Republic